Greenwich Park is a former hunting park in Greenwich and one of the largest single green spaces in south-east London. It commands views over the River Thames, the Isle of Dogs and the City of London (Simon Jenkins rated the view of the Royal Hospital with Canary Wharf in the distance as one of the top ten in England).

The park is open year-round. It is listed Grade I on the Register of Historic Parks and Gardens. In 2020, it was awarded a National Lottery grant to restore its historic features, build a learning centre, enhance the park's biodiversity, and provide better access for people with disabilities.

History 

He built a house by the river, Bella Court, and a small castle, called Greenwich Castle or Duke Humphrey's Tower, on the hill. The former evolved first into the Tudor Palace of Placentia and then into the Queen's House and Greenwich Hospital. Greenwich Castle, by now in disrepair, was chosen for the site of the Royal Observatory by Charles II in 1675, on the advice of Sir Christopher Wren.

As a result of this decision, the Greenwich Prime Meridian crosses Greenwich Park, passing due north and south of the Royal Observatory. Perhaps surprisingly, its route is not marked on the ground.

In the 15th century the park was mostly heathland and probably used for hawking. In the next century, deer were introduced by Henry VIII for hunting, and a small collection of deer is maintained today in an area to the south east. James I enclosed the park with a brick wall, twelve feet high and two miles (3 km) long at a cost of £2000, much of which remains and defines the modern boundary. A small section of the boundary wall in the southwest corner of the park was formerly part of Montagu House, one time residence of Caroline of Brunswick, demolished in 1815, though Queen Caroline's bath (c. 1806) is preserved inside the park. James I also commissioned the first modern ice house in 1619 in the Park.

In the 17th century, the park was landscaped, possibly by André Le Nôtre who is known at least to have designed plans for it. The public were first allowed into the park during the 18th century. Samuel Johnson visited the park in 1763 and commented "Is it not fine?". The famous hill upon which the observatory stands was used on public holidays for mass 'tumbling'.

In the 1830s a railway was nearly driven through the middle of the lower park on a viaduct but the scheme was defeated by intense local opposition. However, the London and Greenwich Railway was later extended beneath the ground via a cut-and-cover tunnel link between Greenwich and Maze Hill which opened in 1878 (the tunnel alignment is on the north side of the northern side of the park's boundary wall, running beneath the gardens of the National Maritime Museum and Queen's House).

In 1888 the park got a station of its own when Greenwich Park railway station was opened. The station was not successful, with most passengers preferring the older Greenwich station, and in 1917 Greenwich Park station and the associated line closed.

Greenwich Park was used for outdoor London scenes including representing the street, Constitution Hill in the 2009 film The Young Victoria starring Emily Blunt and Rupert Friend.

Geography 

The park is roughly rectangular in plan with sides 1000 metres by 750 metres and oriented with the long sides lying NNW to SSE. In what follows this direction is taken to be N to S for ease of exposition. It is located at grid reference .

The park is on two levels, with a number of dips and gullies marking the transition between them. The lower level (closest to the National Maritime Museum, Queen's House and, beyond them, the Thames) lies to the north; from there a steep walk uphill reveals the southern part – a flat expanse that is, essentially, an enclosed extension of the plateau of Blackheath.

Roughly in the centre, on the top of the hill, is the Royal Observatory. At the northern edge is the National Maritime Museum and Queen's House, and beyond those Greenwich Hospital. To the east is Vanbrugh Castle. To the south is Blackheath and in the south-western corner is the Ranger's House, looking out over the heath. To the west lie the architecturally fine streets of Chesterfield Walk and Croom's Hill (Pevsner 1983).

Royal Observatory

The Observatory is on the top of the hill. Outside is a statue of General James Wolfe (buried in St Alfege Church, Greenwich) in a small plaza from which there are views across to the former Greenwich Hospital (the Old Royal Naval College, now the University of Greenwich) and then towards the river, the skyscrapers of Canary Wharf, the City of London to the northwest and The O2 Arena to the north.

Amenities

On the lower level of the park there is a popular children's playground (north-east corner, close to Maze Hill railway station), an adjacent boating lake, & a small orchard ('The Queen's Orchard'). There is also a herb garden (close by entrance to Greenwich town centre).

On the upper level, there is an extensive flower garden complete with large duck pond, a rose garden, a cricket pitch, many 17th-century sweet chestnut trees with gnarled, swirling trunks, tennis courts, a bandstand, Roman remains, an ancient oak tree (known as Queen Elizabeth's Oak, associated with Queen Elizabeth I) and an enclosure ('The Wilderness') housing some wild deer.

Nestling just behind the Observatory is the garden of the former Astronomer Royal, a peaceful secluded space which is good for picnics and also sometimes used by theatre groups (Midsummer Night's Dream, etc.). On the opposite side (i.e., just south of the Wolfe statue) is the Park Café. There is another, smaller café by the north-west gate, and a snack bar in the children's playground.

It is possible to park (pay and display) in areas along the main roads entering from Blackheath. Cycle routes criss-cross the park (as do runners, roller-bladers, dog-walkers, etc.). Until 2020, other road traffic (cars and motor-cycles) could use the park road linking Blackheath and Greenwich at peak periods on weekdays.

Sport
During the London 2012 Summer Olympics, Greenwich Park was the venue for the Olympic equestrian events and for the riding and running parts of the modern pentathlon events. It was also the venue for the Paralympic equestrian events.

The use of Greenwich Park for Olympic equestrian events caused some tension between the London Organising Committee for the Olympic and Paralympic Games 2012 (LOCOG) and some local area residents. A community action group, NOGOE (No to Greenwich Olympic Equestrian Events), believed Greenwich Park was not a suitable venue for the events and started an (ultimately unsuccessful) petition to get the equestrian events relocated; by February 2009 this had gathered over 12,000 signatures.

The park also staged the start of the final stage of the 2006 Tour of Britain cycle race (3 September).

One of three start points for London Marathon, the 'red start', is located in southern Greenwich Park, close to Charlton Way. The London Half-Marathon, Run to the Beat, passed through the park from 2008 to 2012; in 2013, the last running of the 13.1-mile event started and finished in the park.

Gallery

References

Further reading

 (with Bridget Cherry).

External links

 London 2012 Olympics profile

 
Parks and open spaces in the Royal Borough of Greenwich
Royal Parks of London
Conservation areas in London
Venues of the 2012 Summer Olympics
Olympic equestrian venues
Olympic modern pentathlon venues
2012 Summer Paralympic venues
Grade I listed parks and gardens in London